The 1961 Australian Championships was a tennis tournament that took place on outdoor grass courts at the Kooyong Lawn Tennis Club, Melbourne, Australia from 20 to 30 January. It was the 49th edition of the Australian Championships (now known as the Australian Open), the 14th held in Melbourne, and the first Grand Slam tournament of the year. The singles titles were taken by Roy Emerson and Margaret Smith.

Finals

Men's singles

 Roy Emerson defeated  Rod Laver 1–6, 6–3, 7–5, 6–4

Women's singles

 Margaret Smith defeated  Jan Lehane 6–1, 6–4

Men's doubles
 Rod Laver /  Bob Mark defeated  Roy Emerson /  Marty Mulligan 6–3, 7–5, 3–6, 9–11, 6–2

Women's doubles
 Mary Carter Reitano /  Margaret Smith defeated  Mary Bevis Hawton /  Jan Lehane, 6–4, 3–6, 7–5

Mixed doubles
 Jan Lehane /  Bob Hewitt defeated   Mary Carter Reitano /  John Pearce, 9–7, 6–2

References

External links
 Australian Open official website

Australian Championships
Australian Championships (tennis) by year
January 1961 sports events in Australia